Gymnopilus anomalus is a species of mushroom in the family Hymenogastraceae.

See also

 List of Gymnopilus species

anomalus